Cryptantha humilis is a perennial plant in the Borage Family (Boraginaceae). It is commonly called low cryptantha.

Habitat and range

Growth pattern
It has small, densely leafy stems, giving it a cushion-like appearance, and is relatively low growing, hence the common name.

Leaves and stems
Hairy leaves are spoon shaped.

Inflorescence and fruit. 
Inflorescences with 5 lobed, white flowers with a yellow ring inside the upper throat, are and less than wide.
 
The ovate fruits (nutlets) are more wrinkled than C. nubigena.

References

humilis
Flora of the Sierra Nevada (United States)
Flora without expected TNC conservation status